Hervé Cassan (8 March 1947 – 8 March 2021) was a French diplomat, professor, and lawyer. He served as an advisor to Secretary-General of the United Nations Boutros Boutros-Ghali and his successor, Kofi Annan.

Biography
Cassan led a career as both a diplomat and a professor. He advised two United Nations Secretaries-General in New York City, and was a special counselor to the Secretary-General of the Organisation internationale de la Francophonie. He also directed the organization's cabinet. Other positions of his included his time as a lawyer and international consultant.

Cassan was a professor of law at Paris Descartes University for 15 years. He was a visiting professor at The Hague Academy of International Law, the Institute of Higher International Studies in Geneva, and Louisiana State University in the United States. In 2010, he became a law professor at the Université de Sherbrooke in Quebec. His research focused on international mediation and negotiation, as well as procedures for solving international conflicts. He served on the special counsel of the Institute for Research and Education on Negotiation, associated with the ESSEC Business School in Paris.

Hervé Cassan died on 8 March 2021, his 74th birthday.

Books
Contrats internationaux et pays en développement (1990)
Droit international du Développement (1991)
Droit international du développement (2019)
Traité pratique de négociation (2019)

References

1947 births
2021 deaths
French diplomats
Academic staff of the Université de Sherbrooke
20th-century French lawyers
Academic staff of Paris Descartes University
The Hague Academy of International Law people
Louisiana State University faculty
People from Nîmes
21st-century French lawyers